Justice Chandler may refer to:

Bert D. Chandler, associate justice and chief justice of the Michigan Supreme Court
David A. Chandler, associate justice of the Supreme Court of Mississippi
A. Lee Chandler, associate justice of the South Carolina Supreme Court